Plainfield is a village in Will and Kendall counties, Illinois, United States. The population was 44,762 at the 2020 census.

The village includes land in Will County's Plainfield and Wheatland townships, as well as Na-Au-Say and Oswego townships in Kendall County. With the growth in the Chicago suburbs in the 1990s and 2000s, the village has seen a population increase, from 4,500 in 1990 to 28,000 in 2000 to nearly 45,000 in 2016. It is between the cities of Naperville and Joliet.

The village has established a community Preservation Commission and historic preservation ordinance. It is the home of the Lake Renwick Preserve, a county forest preserve used for birdwatching and other activities. Located south of Village Hall is Settlers' Park, which includes a lake, war monument, open space, and more. The park presents outdoor concerts to the public in the summer.

History

The area was called "Walkers' Grove" until it was platted as "Plainfield" in 1841. It was originally settled by a large community of Potawatomi people, and the land was later bequeathed to the United States as part of the Treaty of St. Louis (1816) with the Council of the Three Fires. Indian Boundary Road aligns with the western border of the tract of land originally ceded.

The earliest Europeans in the area were French fur traders. The first European-American settler in the area was James Walker, who with his father-in-law, Methodist minister Jessie Walker, traveled here in 1826 where he established a small mission for the Potawatomi people. James Walker, Jesse Walker's son-in-law, traveled with him and became the first European-American to claim land in the area in 1828.

In 1828, James Walker, in the company of several men, erected a sawmill around which the settlement of Walkers' Grove developed.

Plainfield is identified as the oldest community in Will County because the earliest settlement of Walkers' Grove was established on the banks of the DuPage River by 1828. However, the actual village of Plainfield was platted immediately north of Walkers' Grove in 1834 by Chester Ingersoll. The separate community of East Plainfield was platted in June 1836 by James Mathers, who began selling lots in July 1836. He also constructed a gristmill and a mill race west of Water Street, which would later become Plainfield-Naperville Road. Ingersoll's "Planefield" (Plainfield) which comprised lots in Section 16, along with Mather's East Plainfield lots in Section 10 and Levi Arnold's plat of Section 9, all became joined to create the present-day village after the death of Levi Arnolds in 1845.

Walkers' Grove flourished because of the DuPage River and established routes to Fort Dearborn in Chicago, as well as to Ottawa to the west. Reuben Flagg hauled lumber from Walker's mill to Chicago in order to erect the first two frame structures in the city (the P.F.W. Peck House and the George Dole Forwarding House). Chicago also depended upon the settlement for mail and supplies.

The community's early prosperity was stunted when the Illinois and Michigan Canal opened in 1848, because the village was not located along the canal. Located within the village are numerous Greek Revival, Upright and Wing cottages, a school built in 1847, and a number of early-19th-century homes. Plainfield currently has three buildings listed on the National Register of Historic Places: Plainfield Halfway House, Flanders House, and a 1928 Standard Oil gas station.

Plainfield abolitionists offered food and shelter to runaway slaves following the Underground Railroad.

North Central College was founded in the village in 1861 as Plainfield College.

The Plainfield Public Library District was founded in the village in 1925 as the Nimmons Village of Plainfield Free Public Library.

Plainfield is the birthplace of Eddie Gardner, one of the pilots credited with establishing the transcontinental air mail routes for the United States Postal Service. The earliest architects associated with buildings in Plainfield are J.E. Minott of Aurora; G. Julian Barnes & John H. Barnes of Joliet; and Herbert Cowell of Joliet and Plainfield.

On August 28, 1990, an F5 tornado ran its course through Plainfield. The "Plainfield Tornado" killed 29 people, 24 of whom were killed instantly, and 350 were injured. More than 1,100 homes were damaged and destroyed. It destroyed the only Plainfield high school at the time, now called Plainfield Central High School. A population boom started to take place at the end of the 20th century after the tornado, with a large number of new home subdivisions. Before this, Plainfield was primarily an agricultural town.

Certain older parts of Plainfield once suffered from extreme traffic congestion. Before Interstate 55 was built just east of the village in the late 1950s, U.S. Route 30 (the Lincoln Highway) and U.S. Route 66 (sometimes referred to as "The Mother Road") merged into one street for three blocks in the center of town on what is now Illinois Route 59. The merge was between Plainfield/Joliet Road on the south to Lockport Street on the north, but continues to be an area of heavy traffic congestion even outside heavy commuting periods. At one time, the two longest paved highways in the world (Lincoln Highway and U.S. Route 66) crossed within Plainfield. The highways only crossed each other twice and both locations are in Will County. The other location is in neighboring Joliet.

Geography
Plainfield is located in northwestern Will County at  (41.617280, -88.202837). The village limits extend west into the eastern part of Kendall County. Plainfield is bordered to the north by the city of Naperville, to the northeast by the village of Bolingbrook, to the east by the village of Romeoville, and to the south by the city of Joliet. Farmland in Kendall County is to the west.

Interstate 55 runs along the eastern edge of the village, with access from two exits. I-55 leads northeast  to the center of Chicago and southwest  to Bloomington. U.S. Route 30 passes through the center of Plainfield, leading northwest  to Montgomery and southeast  to Joliet. Illinois Route 126 crosses US-30 in the center of Plainfield, leading northeast  to I-55 and west  to Yorkville. Illinois Route 59 runs through the center of Plainfield with US-30 but leads north  to the west side of Naperville and south  to Shorewood.

The DuPage River flows through the village center, running south towards the Des Plaines River in the Illinois River watershed.

Like its namesake, Plainfield's topography is generally flat. Thousands of years ago, land in greater Plainfield used to be part of the bed of proglacial Lake Wauponsee. However, the lake did not hold up long, and eventually drained into the Illinois River valley. The lake left behind a very flat landscape. This rise in elevation was created by terminal moraines that were formed during the Wisconsin Episode of the last ice age's last glacial period that has been recorded.

Demographics

As of the census of 2010, there were 39,581 people, 11,920 households, and 10,155 families residing in the village. The racial makeup of the village was 81.72% White, 5.56% African American, 0.22% Native American, 7.62% Asian, 0.04% Pacific Islander, 2.6% from other races, and 2.22% from two or more races. Hispanic or Latino of any race were 10.73% of the population.

There were 11,920 households, out of which 55.4% had children under the age of 18 living with them, 74.2% were married couples living together, 7.9% had a female householder with no husband present, and 14.8% were non-families. 11.5% of all households were made up of individuals, and 2.9% had someone living alone who was 65 years of age or older. The average household size was 3.31 and the average family size was 3.62.

In the village, the population was spread out, with 35.2% under the age of 18, 6% from 18 to 24, 31.8% from 25 to 44, 21.7% from 45 to 64, and 5.3% who were 65 years of age or older. The median age was 33.8 years. For every 100 females, there were 98.4 males. For every 100 females age 18 and over, there were 95 males.

According to a 2014 estimate by the U.S. Census, the median income for a household in the village was $111,536. About 1.0% of families and 1.8% of the population were below the poverty line, including 2.2% of those under age 18 and 2.3% of those age 65 or over.

Transportation

Major highways
Major highways in Plainfield include:

Interstate Highways
 Interstate 55

US Highways
 US 30
 US 66

Illinois Highways
 Route 59
 Route 126

Pace
The Pace bus system expanded two routes (755 and 855) to Plainfield beginning May 6, 2013. Both routes are "bi-directional, weekday rush hour service" from the Plainfield Village Center to Downtown Chicago. One route terminates in the Illinois Medical District and the other in Chicago's East Loop.

Education

Plainfield Community Consolidated School District 202 serves portions of Plainfield, Joliet, Crest Hill, Bolingbrook, Romeoville, and Plainfield Township in unincorporated parts of Will County.

Peak enrollment in the district took place in 2010–2011 at 29,254 students. The enrollment has been steadily declining since that time, and is currently declining at several hundred students per year. Current enrollment is 26,545 for the 2018–2019 school year.

Notable people 

 Kapri Bibbs, NFL running back; raised in Plainfield and played for Plainfield North High School's varsity football team; won Super Bowl 50 with Denver Broncos
 Joel Kim Booster, comedian, actor, and writer. Born in Seoul, South Korea and raised in Plainfield.
 Lisa Chesson, Olympic defenseman with U.S. women's ice hockey team; born in Plainfield and played on Plainfield Central High School's varsity hockey team
 Shea Couleé, a drag queen known for competing on RuPaul's Drag Race (season 9); RuPaul's Drag Race All Stars Season 5 winner; raised in Plainfield
 Nate Fox, power forward and center with several European teams
 John Henebry, US Air Force general; born in Plainfield
 Maurizio Iacono, Canadian-born recording artist and singer for heavy metal band Kataklysm
 Melissa McCarthy, actress; born in Plainfield
 Kristopher Prather, professional ten-pin bowler and winner of the 2019 PBA Tour Playoffs; resides in Plainfield
 Alexander Ratiu, Romanian political prisoner; priest at St. Mary Immaculate Church (1975–1982)
 Warren L. Wood, Illinois politician; lived in Plainfield
 Kahmari Montgomery, Professional track athlete for Nike.

See also

References

External links
 
 Landmarks Preservation Council of Illinois

 
1841 establishments in Illinois
Populated places established in 1841
Populated places on the Underground Railroad
Villages in Illinois
Villages in Kendall County, Illinois
Villages in Will County, Illinois